Noncovalent solid-phase organic synthesis or NC-SPOS is a form of Solid-phase synthesis whereby the organic substrate is bonded to the solid phase not by a covalent bond but by other chemical interactions. This bond may consist of an induced dipole interaction between a hydrophobic matrix and a hydrophobic anchor. As long as the reaction medium is hydrophilic (polar) in nature the anchor will remain on the solid phase. Switching to a nonpolar solvent releases the organic substrate containing the anchor.  

In one experimental setup the hydrophobic matrix is RP silica gel (C18) and the anchor is acridone. Acridone is N-alkylated and the terminal alkene group is converted into an aldehyde by ozonolysis. This compound is bonded to RP silica gel and this system is subjected to a tandem sequence of organic reactions. The first reaction is a Barbier reaction  with propargylic bromide in water (green chemistry) and the second reaction is a Sonogashira coupling. Substrates may vary in these sequences and in this way a chemical library of new compounds can be realized.

References 

Solid-phase synthesis